Nufolhey Maa is a 1989 Maldivian drama film produced and directed by Mohamed Musthafa Hussain. The film stars Hassan Afeef, Asima, Ibrahim Rasheed in pivotal roles. The film focuses on a love triangle between a doctor, nurse and patient.

Premise
Ibrahim Manik (Chilhiya Moosa Manik) and his wife, Shareefa (Fathimath Didi), arrange their daughter, Athifa's (Asima) marriage with their friend's son, Dr. Athif (Ibrahim Rasheed) who works in the same hospital with Athifa. However, things go sideways when Athifa starts spending more time with a patient, Shiyam (Hassan Afeef) who is instantly attracted to her.

Cast 
 Hassan Afeef as Shiyam
 Asima as Athifa
 Ibrahim Rasheed as Dr. Athif
 Moosa Sameer as Dhonthu
 Shaukath Ibrahim Didi as Moosafulhu
 Fathimath Didi as Shareefa
 Shakir
 Suneetha
 Mariyam Manike
 Haaroon
 Chilhiya Moosa Manik as Ibrahim Manik

Soundtrack

References

Maldivian drama films
1989 films
1989 drama films
Dhivehi-language films